1950 Emperor's Cup Final was the 30th final of the Emperor's Cup competition. The final was played at Kariya Stadium in Aichi on June 4, 1950. All Kwangaku won the championship.

Overview
All Kwangaku won the championship, by defeating Keio University 6–1.

Match details

See also
1950 Emperor's Cup

References

Emperor's Cup
Emperor's Cup Final
Emperor's Cup Final